is a Japanese football player who plays for Roasso Kumamoto.

Club statistics
Updated to 10 December 2017.

References

External links

Profile at JEF United Chiba

1986 births
Living people
Association football people from Chiba Prefecture
Japanese footballers
J1 League players
J2 League players
J3 League players
Ventforet Kofu players
Hokkaido Consadole Sapporo players
Giravanz Kitakyushu players
Tokyo Verdy players
JEF United Chiba players
Roasso Kumamoto players
Association football goalkeepers